Ayeshteni (Arabic: عيشتني) is the fourth album by Belgian singer Natacha Atlas. It was released by Mantra Records on May 8, 2001. The album received extensive play on college radio and sold around 15,000 copies in its first two years of release.

Track listing 
All tracks written and composed by Natacha Atlas, except where noted.
 "Shubra" (Alex Kasiek, Hamid ManTu, Atlas) - 5:40
 "I Put a Spell on You" (Screamin' Jay Hawkins) - 3:39
 "Ashwa" - 6:00
 "Ayeshteni" (Atlas, Mika Sabet) - 4:54
 "Soleil d'Égypte" (Magyd Cherfi, Zebda) - 3:11
 "Ne me quitte pas" (Jacques Brel) - 4:27
 "Mish fadilak" - 5:07
 "Rah" (Atlas, Sabet) - 6:17
 "Lelsama" - 5:48
 "Fakrenha" - 5:04
 "Manbai" (Nitin Sawhney remix) (Essam Rashad, Atlas) - 7:47

French edition
 "Shubra" - 5:40
 "Le Goût du Pain" (Didier Golemanas, Kamel El Habchi) - 3:37
 "Ashwa" - 6:00
 "Ayeshteni" - 4:54
 "Ne me quitte pas" - 4:27
 "Mish fadilak" - 5:07
 "Rah" - 6:17
 "I Put a Spell on You" - 3:39
 "Lelsama" - 5:48
 "Fakrenha" - 5:04
 "Manbai" - 10:13
 "Mish Fadilak" (French version) - 4:03

Charts

References

External links 
 

2001 albums
Beggars Banquet Records albums
Natacha Atlas albums